Crataegus dilatata is a species of hawthorn known by the common names broadleaf hawthorn and apple-leaf hawthorn. Crataegus dilatata is native from New York to New England, and the southernmost parts of Ontario and Quebec. The Latin name means "dilated" or "spread out" which describes the broad leaves.

References

dilatata
Flora of North America